Aslan Duz (also Romanized as Aşlān Dūz and Aslandooz; also known as Aslāndūz Tepe) is a city in the Central District of Aslan Duz County, Ardabil province, Iran. It serves as the capital of the county. The city was originally in Aslan Duz District of Parsabad County before the district rose to the status of a county. At the 2006 census, its population was 3,910 in 862 households. The following census in 2011 counted 4,557 people in 1,172 households. The latest census in 2016 showed a population of 6,348 people in 1,760 households. The Battle of Aslanduz was fought nearby in 1812.

References 

Aslan Duz County

Cities in Ardabil Province

Populated places in Ardabil Province